Coeur d'Alene Parkway State Park is a  paved trail in Kootenai County, Idaho, United States. The parkway is located south of Coeur d'Alene along the north shore of Lake Coeur d'Alene. It is a portion of the North Idaho Centennial Trail. Park features include a boat launch, docks, and picnic area at Higgens Point.

See also
 List of Idaho state parks
 National Parks in Idaho

References

External links
Coeur d'Alene Parkway State Park Idaho Parks and Recreation 
Coeur d'Alene Parkway State Park Map Idaho Parks and Recreation

State parks of Idaho
Protected areas of Kootenai County, Idaho